Alejandro Fernández de Araoz y de la Devesa (1894 – 8 November 1970) was a Spanish lawyer and banker. During the Second Spanish Republic he was briefly Governor of the Bank of Spain.

Life

Alejandro Fernández de Araoz y de la Devesa was born  in 1894 in Medina del Campo, Valladolid, Spain.
He was the son of Clemente Fernández de la Devesa and Margarita de Araoz Alonso.
Fernández Araoz became a state attorney.
He married Carmen Marañón y Moya (1913–2005).
Their children were  María del Carmen, María de los Dolores and Alejandro Fernández de Araoz Marañón.

Alejandro Fernández Araoz ran on a Left Liberal platform and was elected deputy for the Arévalo district of Ávila on 29 April 1923 by 5,730 votes out of 9,292.
He held office from 8 May 1923 to 15 September 1923.

Alfredo de Zavala y Lafora was appointed Minister of Finance by Alejandro Lerroux on 3 April 1935, holding office until 6 May 1935.
During this period Fernández Araoz acted as Governor of the Bank of Spain.
After a month Lerroux submitted the resignation of the entire cabinet.
Zavala Lafora resumed his position at the Bank of Spain in May 1935.

Alejandro Fernández de Araoz y de la Devesa died in Madrid on 8 November 1970.
He was Chairman of the Board of the Banco Internacional de Comercio.

Notes

Sources

1894 births
1970 deaths
Governors of the Bank of Spain